Mrs. Doubtfire is a musical based on the 1993 film of the same name, which in turn is based on the 1987 novel Alias Madame Doubtfire by Anne Fine, with music and lyrics by Karey and Wayne Kirkpatrick and a book by Karey Kirkpatrick and John O'Farrell.

Background 
A musical adaptation of Mrs. Doubtfire was in the works in 2015, with music by Alan Menken, lyrics by David Zippel, and a book by Harvey Fierstein (who played Frank Hillard in the movie). Producer Kevin McCollum had previously spoken to The New York Times in 2013 about the 1993 movie's musical prospects, noting that the plot was "tailored for Broadway audiences". However, three years later, Menken told that the project was put on 'creative hiatus', citing changes in the creative team as the problem. Nevertheless, in 2018, McCollum revealed that the adaptation was still aiming for a Broadway bow, but with an entirely different creative team which includes Karey and Wayne Kirkpatrick composing the score, and John O'Farrell and Karey Kirkpatrick writing the book. Tony Award-winner Jerry Zaks became the director of the show.

On May 16 and 17, 2019, the musical held a reading with a cast including Rob McClure, Kate Baldwin, Mario Cantone, and Jake Ryan Flynn.

Productions 
The musical is directed by Jerry Zaks with choreography by Lorin Latarro and music supervision, arrangements and orchestrations by Ethan Popp. Rob McClure plays the role of Daniel Hillard/Mrs. Doubtfire, with Jenn Gambatese as Miranda Hillard, Brad Oscar as Frank Hillard, Analise Scarpaci as Lydia Hillard, Jake Ryan Flynn as Christopher Hillard, Avery Sell as Natalie Hillard, J. Harrison Ghee as Andre, Mark Evans as Stuart Dunmire, Charity Angél Dawson as Wanda Sellner, and Peter Bartlett as Mr. Jolly. The cast originally included the late Doreen Montalvo as Janet Lundy. Montalvo performed in the Seattle tryout and the three pre-COVID Broadway previews, but passed away of a sudden ailment in October 2020.

Seattle 
The musical made its world premiere at the 5th Avenue Theatre in Seattle, Washington, beginning previews on November 26, 2019, with an official opening on December 13, with an intention to run until December 29 before being extended due to popular demand until January 4, 2020.

Broadway
Mrs. Doubtfire began Broadway previews on March 9, 2020, at the Stephen Sondheim Theatre, with a planned opening night the following month. Due to the Governor's response to the coronavirus pandemic, all Broadway productions were suspended on March 12, 2020. Mrs. Doubtfire resumed previews on October 21, 2021, officially opening December 5. The production went on hiatus from January 10, 2022, through April 14. A month after reopening, producers announced the production would close on May 29, 2022, after 43 previews and 83 regular performances.

Manchester 
On November 5, 2021, it was announced that the musical will make its UK premiere at the Manchester Opera House the following year, opening on 2 September, and running until 1 October. The run received generally favourable reviews.

London 
On November 15, 2022, it was announced that the musical will transfer to London's Shaftesbury Theatre, opening on 12 May 2023.

Other performances 
On November 18, 2021, the cast of Mrs. Doubtfire performed their song "Rockin' Now" on Good Morning America.

Musical numbers
Source: Playbill

Act I
"What's Wrong with This Picture" – Lydia, Miranda, Daniel, Ensemble
"I Want to Be There" – Daniel
"Make Me a Woman" – Daniel, Andre, Frank, Ensemble
"What the Hell" – Lydia, Natalie, Christopher
"The Mr. Jolly Show" – Mr. Jolly, Ensemble
“Easy Peasy" – Daniel, Ensemble
"The Mr. Jolly Show” (Reprise) – Mr. Jolly, Ensemble
"About Time" – Daniel
"Rockin’ Now" – Daniel, Frank, Andre, Lydia, Christopher, Natalie, Ensemble

Act II
“Entr’acte” – Orchestra
"The Shape of Things to Come" – Miranda, Female Ensemble
"Big Fat No" – Stuart, Daniel, Male Ensemble
"Let Go" – Miranda
"Clean Up This Mess" – Daniel
"Playing with Fire" – Wanda, Ensemble
"He Lied to Me" – Flamenco Singer, Flamenco Dancers
"Just Pretend" – Daniel, Lydia
"As Long as There Is Love" – Full Company

Cast

Reception

The Broadway production received mixed reviews, with praise for the cast, namely McClure, Scarpaci, Oscar, and Bartlett. However, some of the characters and plot points were criticized for feeling written as tired and forgettable. Likewise, the score was mostly criticized for being unmemorable, though enjoyable.

Awards and nominations

References

External links
 
Official Broadway site
Official UK site

2019 musicals
Musicals based on films
Musicals based on novels
Broadway musicals
Plays set in the 21st century
Plays set in California